Cornelus "Kees" Krijgh (born 13 February 1950) is Dutch retired professional football player. He was usually fielded as defender.

Krijgh started playing football with his local team BVV. His professional career took off with NEC, where he would stay one season. In the next two years, Krijgh played for De Graafschap and FC Den Bosch. In 1972, Krijgh signed with PSV Eindhoven, where he would spend most of his career. Highlight during this period was the final of the UEFA Cup in 1978, in which PSV defeated French side SC Bastia. In 1979, Krijgh went to Cercle Brugge, a Belgian team that just had won promotion to first division. After two seasons in Belgium, Krijgh chose Willem II Tilburg as his last team.

Krijgh appeared twice in his national colours. He made his debut on 15 October 1975 in a 3-0 home win against Poland. His was capped a second time against Italy.

His uncle, also nicknamed Kees Krijgh (real name: Cornelis Krijgh)', was also a Dutch footballer.

External links
Kees Krijgh player info at NECfan.nl 
Kees Krijgh player info at Cerclemuseum.be 

1950 births
Living people
Sportspeople from 's-Hertogenbosch
Footballers from North Brabant
Dutch footballers
Netherlands international footballers
Eredivisie players
NEC Nijmegen players
De Graafschap players
FC Den Bosch players
PSV Eindhoven players
Cercle Brugge K.S.V. players
Willem II (football club) players
Dutch expatriate footballers
Expatriate footballers in Belgium
Belgian Pro League players
Association football utility players
Association football defenders
UEFA Cup winning players